William Wirjaatmadja Wongso (born 12 April 1947) is a culinary expert from Indonesia, specializing in Asian and European cuisine. He is the son of Soewadi Wongso (Wong See Hwa).

Wongso initially did not receive formal culinary training, but learned from sidewalk food vendors and eventually trained in pastry and baking with chefs at hotels in Indonesia.

In 1978, Wongso attended East Sydney Technical College for its baking program. In 1982, he attended Swiss Masters Bakers and Confectionery program in Lucerne, Switzerland, and then spent the following years of training in pastry, baking, chocolate, and ice cream in the Netherlands, Germany, France, and Italy until 1987.

Wongso intended originally to follow the in footsteps of his father and pursue a career in film and photography, but his father's hobby of cooking inspired his passion for the culinary arts.
 
In 2001, France's Ministry of Agriculture awarded Wongso the Chevalier dans l'Ordre National du Merite for his role in promoting French cuisine and gastronomy.

In 2008, Indonesian Vice-President Jusuf Kalla awarded Wongso the Professional Certification Authority (BNSP) for his dedication to culinary vocational education.

In 2009, the Korean Tourism Board named Wongso the Goodwill Ambassador for South Korea.

Career

 Proprietor, "Warung Sunset" 
 Proprietor, "Vineth Bakery"
 Proprietor, "William Kafe Artistik"
 Proprietor, "William Gourmet Catering"
 President, Chaine des Rotisseurs, Indonesian Chapter (1986-1993)
 President, International Wine & Food Society, Jakarta Chapter (1991-1994)
 Culinary Consultant, Garuda Indonesian Airways
 Advisory Council, Culinary Advisor, Bina Nusantara University, Hotel Management 
 Program Host, "Cooking Adventures with William Wongso", MetroTV

Awards

 BNSP Competency Award 2008, National Professional Certification Board

References

Indonesian people of Chinese descent
Living people
People from Malang
1947 births